The crocodile-faced dtella (Gehyra xenopus) is a species of gecko endemic to  Western Australia. It was first described in 1978 by Glen Milton Storr.

References

Gehyra
Reptiles described in 1978
Geckos of Australia